The 2017 Oceania Athletics Championships were held at the ANZ Stadium in Suva, Fiji between June 28 and July 1, 2017. The event was held jointly with the Oceania under 18 and under 20 championships, including exhibition events for masters and for athletes with disabilities (parasports).

Participating nations (Unofficial)
A total of 22 teams participated in the senior championships. There were 21 nations with 1 regional team from Australia. The regional Australian team (RAT) competed separately and not as Australia.

  (3)
  (37)
 / Northern Australia (11)
  (6)
  (5)
  (Host) (42)
  (1)
  (8)
  (2)
  (2)
  (6)
  (12)
  (15)
  (1)
  (1)
  (1)
  (29)
  (17)
  (9)
  (8)
  (5)
  (5)

Medal table (Unofficial)

Medal summary
A total of 47 events were originally scheduled for the championships, however, 3 events for women were cancelled due to no entries, while medals for the men's 5000m race walk were never distributed because of both entries disqualified. Resulting in a total of 43 medal events.

Complete results can be found on the Oceania Athletics Association webpage.

Men

Women

Mixed

References 

Oceania Athletics Championships
International athletics competitions hosted by Fiji
Oceania Athletics Championships
Oceania Athletics Championships
June 2017 sports events in Oceania
July 2017 sports events in Oceania